The 1960 United States presidential election in North Carolina took place on November 8, 1960, as part of the 1960 United States presidential election. North Carolina voters chose 14 representatives, or electors, to the Electoral College, who voted for president and vice president.

North Carolina was won by Senator John F. Kennedy (D–Massachusetts), running with Senator Lyndon B. Johnson, with 52.11 percent of the popular vote against incumbent Vice President Richard Nixon (R–California), running with United States Ambassador to the United Nations Henry Cabot Lodge, Jr., with 47.89 percent of the popular vote.

Results

Results by county

References

North Carolina
1960
1960 North Carolina elections